Dale was an electoral district of the Legislative Assembly in the Australian state of Western Australia from 1950 to 1989.

Dale was a mostly rural district based to the east of Perth. It was a safe seat for the Liberal Party. The district was abolished ahead of the 1989 state election, when its last member Fred Tubby won the new seat of Roleystone.

Members

Election results

Dale
1950 establishments in Australia
Constituencies established in 1950
1989 disestablishments in Australia
Constituencies disestablished in 1989